The 1924–25 season was Real Madrid Club de Fútbol's 23rd season in existence. The club played some friendly matches. They also played in the Campeonato Regional Centro (Central Regional Championship).

Friendlies

Competitions

Overview

Campeonato Regional Centro

League table

Matches

Notes

References

Real Madrid
Real Madrid CF seasons